The Workers' Communist Party of Bosnia and Herzegovina is a communist party from Bosnia and Herzegovina. It was formed in 2000 and strongly opposes the nationalism present in the region and the collapse of the Socialist Federal Republic of Yugoslavia.

Some of their major aims are the introduction of workers' self-management and participatory democracy, as well as the re-establishment of a socialist federal Yugoslavia. They say they are not motivated by nostalgia, as they are critical of Josip Broz Tito.

They believe that socialism has to be democratic and strongly oppose the system of the former Soviet Union and other former governments. They have been particularly influenced by Rosa Luxemburg and Antonio Gramsci.

See also
Communist Party (Bosnia and Herzegovina)

References

2000 establishments in Bosnia and Herzegovina
Anti-nationalist parties
Communist parties in Bosnia and Herzegovina
Democratic socialist parties in Europe
Political parties established in 2000
Secularism in Bosnia and Herzegovina
Yugoslavism
International Meeting of Communist and Workers Parties